Longitarsus allotrophus is a species of beetle from the Chrysomelidae family that is endemic to Israel.

References

A
Beetles described in 1979
Endemic fauna of Israel
Insects of the Middle East
Beetles of Asia